Ángeles Santos Torroella (7 November 1911 – 3 October 2013) was a Catalan Spanish surrealist painter. Born in Portbou, Catalonia, she was the sister of the poet and art critic Rafael Santos Torroella. She married the painter Emili Grau Sala. Her son is the painter :ca:Julià Grau i Santos. In 2003 she received the Gold Medal of Merit in the Fine Arts, awarded by the Ministry of Culture of Spain and in 2005, the Creu de Sant Jordi, awarded by the Government of Catalonia.

Biography
In 1929 Santos Torroella presented her work Un Mundo (A World) at the Autumn Salon in Madrid. The next year she was given her own room at the exhibition. In 1931 she held a solo exhibit in Paris. In 1932, she participated in the Iberian Artists Collective in Copenhagen and Paris, and the next year was invited to the exhibit at the Carnegie Institute in Pittsburgh (USA). In 1936, she exhibited at the Spanish Pavilion of the Venice Biennale. She exhibited in Barcelona for the first time in 1935, at Syra Galleries.

In 1936, at the outbreak of the Spanish Civil War, Santos Torroella and her husband fled Spain for France. She returned to Spain by herself in 1937. The couple reunited in 1962.

Work
Her work early work ranges from expressionism to surrealism, though it later moved into Post-Impressionism, primordially landscape and interiors. Her most renowned painting is a large-format oil called Un mundo, representing a strange surreal planet, which she painted when she was 18 and is currently held at the Museo Nacional Centro de Arte Reina Sofia in Madrid.

Works in museums
 Museo Nacional Centro de Arte Reina Sofía, Madrid
 :ca:Museu de l'Empordà, Figueres

Death
Torroella died on 3 October 2013, at the age of 101.

References

External links
 images of Ángeles Santos Torroella's work at The Museo Reina Sofía

1911 births
2013 deaths
Painters from Catalonia
Women artists from Catalonia
Spanish centenarians
Spanish women artists
People from Alt Empordà
20th-century Spanish women artists
Women centenarians